Leslie Banning (born Mary Louise Welch) is a retired American film actress. She is sometimes credited as Leslye Banning.

Banning attended Glendale High School.

Banning signed a contract with Universal International in 1949. She played the female lead in the Western film Cactus Caravan (1951).

On May 1, 1949, Banning married Wallace Russell, brother of actress Jane Russell. In 1974, her married name was Mary Lou Rogers; she was married to a teacher in Simi Valley, California.

Selected filmography

 Renegades of the Sage (1949)
 Dangerous Inheritance (1950)
 A Woman of Distinction (1950)
 Girls' School (1950)
 Hurricane at Pilgrim Hill (1950)
 His Kind of Woman (1951)
 Black Hills Ambush (1952)
 Stagecoach to Fury (1956)

References

Bibliography
 Bernard A. Drew. Motion Picture Series and Sequels: A Reference Guide. Routledge, 2013.

External links

1930 births
Living people
20th-century American actresses
American film actresses
People from Los Angeles
21st-century American women